Princess Princep Rajya Lakshmi Devi Shah of Nepal (March 16, 1930 - May 22, 1982) was, by marriage, a princess of Nepal. She was the wife of Prince Himalaya of Nepal, the second son of King Tribhuvan of Nepal. She was a sister-in-law of King Mahendra and Prince Basundhara.

In 1963, she helped establish the Nepal Red Cross Society, chairing the organisation for 20 years. She was awarded the Nansen Refugee Award in 1969.

Early life and education
Princess Princep Shah was born at the Bahadur Bhawan, Kathmandu, on March 16, 1930. She was the eldest daughter of General Nara Shamsher Jang Bahadur Rana, KCVO, sometime Inspector-General of the Royal Nepal Police, by his first wife, Uma Rajya Laxmi, of Doti.

She studied Nepali literature at Tribhuvan University.

Princess Princep Shah was the older sister of Princess Helen Shah, first wife of his brother-in-law, Prince Basundhara of Nepal.

Royal activities 
Princep married Prince Himalaya of Nepal on March 5, 1945, in Kathmandu.

Along with her husband, Princess Princep attended the coronation of Queen Elizabeth II in 1953, at Westminster Abbey in London.

In 1965, the princess and her husband founded the Soaltee Crowne Plaza hotel, which was later renamed as the Soaltee Holiday Inn Crowne Plaza Kathmandu in 1994.

Princess Princep Shah was the founder of Nepal Red Cross Society in 1963. She chaired organisation for 20 years, including when it joined the International Committee of the Red Cross on October 1, 1964. She was one of several Nepali representatives to the United Nations, and a member of the Nepal Leprosy Relief Organization.

She was awarded the 1969 Nansen Refugee Award for her leadership of the Nepal Red Cross' support for Tibetan refugees in Nepal.

Styles 
 Lady Princep Rajya Laxmi Kumari Rana (1930–1945).
 HRH Princess Princep Shah of Nepal (1945–1982).

Death 
Princess Princep died at the Samitivej Hospital, Bangkok, on 22 May 1982.

Honours

National Honours 
 Member of the Order of Om Rama Patta (24 February 1975).
 Member of the Order of the Three Divine Powers, 1st Class (2 May 1956).
 Member of the Order of Gurkha Right Hand, 1st Class (1965).
 King Mahendra Coronation Medal (2 May 1956).
 King Birendra Coronation Medal (24 February 1975).

Foreign Honours 
  : Queen Elizabeth II Coronation Medal (2 June 1953).
  : Dame of Justice of the Most Venerable Order of Saint John [DStJ] (11 December 1975).

See also 

 Princess Helen Shah of Nepal

References

External links 

 Prince Himalaya B B Shah, and Wife Princess Princep Shah (photo), National Archives of Singapore

Nepalese princesses
Nepalese royalty
Members of the Order of Tri Shakti Patta, First Class
Members of the Order of Gorkha Dakshina Bahu, First Class
Dames of Justice of the Order of St John
1930 births
1982 deaths
Organization founders
Women founders
People from Kathmandu
Shah dynasty
Rana dynasty
Nansen Refugee Award laureates